Ördekli is a village in the central district of Hakkâri Province in Turkey. The village is populated by Kurds of the Geravî tribe and had a population of 130 in 2022. The five hamlets of Akar, Doğanca, İlik, Oyaca, Subaşı, Tepeli and Yuvacık are attached to the village.

History 
The village was populated by 25 Assyrian families in 1850 and 24 families in 1877.

The village was depopulated in the 1990s during the Kurdish–Turkish conflict.

Population 
Population history from 2000 to 2022:

References 

Villages in Hakkâri District
Kurdish settlements in Hakkâri Province
Historic Assyrian communities in Turkey